Andy Reed (born 4 May 1969) is a British former rugby union player who played lock for Bodmin RFC, Camborne RFC, Bath Rugby, London Wasps, Cornwall Rugby Football Union, and represented Scotland 18 times between 1993 and 1999. He also represented the British & Irish Lions against New Zealand in 1993 and captained Scotland on their tour of Argentina in 1994. Whilst at Wasps he helped them win the Anglo-Welsh Cup in 2000.

He is now a plumber in Cornwall.

References

External links

Lions profile
profile on www.waspslegends.co.uk
profile on Scrum.com

1969 births
Living people
Cornish rugby union players
Scottish rugby union players
British & Irish Lions rugby union players from Scotland
Bath Rugby players
Wasps RFC players
Scotland international rugby union players
People from St Austell
Rugby union players from Cornwall
Rugby union locks